The 2019 Plymouth City Council election was held on 2 May 2019 to elect members of Plymouth City Council in England.

The Labour Party took control of the council after the 2018 election, with thirty-one members and a working majority. Labour defended nine seats, and the Conservatives defended ten. Labour won the election, winning ten of the nineteen seats up for election, with the Conservatives winning the other nine.

Background 
Plymouth City Council held local elections on 2 May 2019 along with councils across England as part of the 2019 local elections. The council elects its councillors in thirds, with a third being up for election every year for three years, with no election each fourth year to correspond with councillors' four-year terms. Councillors defending their seats in this election were previously elected in 2015. In that election, ten Conservative candidates and nine Labour candidates were elected.

Following the 2018 Plymouth City Council election, the council has been controlled by the Labour Party, initially with thirty-one councillors.

Labour held its seat in a subsequent by-election in Stoke ward, which took place in July 2018. As the councillor who stood down was elected in the same cycle as 2019, Jemima Laing, the winner of the by-election, was the incumbent up for re-election. Kevin Neil, who was elected in 2018, was suspended from the Labour Party when a police investigation was launched into him. He continues to sit as an independent following the closure of the police investigation, pending an internal investigation by the party.

Labour and the Conservatives contested all nineteen seats up for election, whilst the Liberal Democrats stood seventeen candidates and the UK Independence Party stood twelve.

Overall results

Note: All changes in vote share are in comparison to the corresponding 2015 election.

Ward results
Asterisks denote sitting councillors seeking re-election.

Budshead

Compton

Devonport

Drake

Efford and Lipson

Eggbuckland

Ham

Honicknowle

Moor View

Peverell

Plympton Erle

Plympton St Mary

Plymstock Dunstone

Plymstock Radford

Southway

St Budeaux

St Peter and the Waterfront

Stoke

Sutton and Mount Gould

References

2019 English local elections
2019
2010s in Devon
May 2019 events in the United Kingdom